Wincenty Teofil Popiel-Chościak (born 21 July 1825 in Czaple Wielkie, died on 7 December 1912 in Warsaw) was a Polish Roman Catholic priest, Bishop of Płock from 1863 to 1875, Bishop of Kujawy–Kaliska from 1876 to 1883, and the metropolitan Archbishop of Warsaw from 1883 to 1912.

Life
Popiel was the son of Konstanty Popiel and Zofia von Badenich. He studied law in Warsaw, after which he went work in the judiciary. After his father's death, when he returned to Czaple Wielkie he decided to attend the seminary in Kielce (Wyższe Seminarium Duchowne w Kielcach). He completed his studies there in 1849. He was ordained a priest on 5 August 1849. He then studied at Leuven in Belgium, where he received a doctorate in theology. This was followed by studies in Rome. After returning to Kielce, he became a professor at the seminary and served as its vice-regens (vice-chairman).

In 1862 he became the rector of the Theological Academy in Warsaw at the former monastery at the Church of St Francis. In 1863 he was appointed Bishop of Plock by Pope Pius IX. In 1868 he was exiled to Veliky Novgorod. On his return in 1876 he was appointed Bishop of Kujawy–Kaliska.

Notes and references

1825 births
1912 deaths
19th-century Roman Catholic bishops in Poland
Archbishops of Warsaw
Bishops of Kujawy and Włocławek
Bishops of Płock
People from Miechów County
Burials at St. John's Archcathedral, Warsaw